Klášterec nad Ohří is a town in Chomutov District in the Ústí nad Labem Region of the Czech Republic. It has about 14,000 inhabitants. The historic town centre is well preserved and is protected by law as an urban monument zone.

Administrative parts
The town part of Miřetice u Klášterce nad Ohří and villages of Ciboušov, Hradiště, Klášterecká Jeseň, Lestkov, Mikulovice, Rašovice, Suchý Důl, Šumná, Útočiště and Vernéřov are administrative parts of Klášterec nad Ohří.

Geography

The Ohře River flows through the town.

The municipal territory lies in three geomorphological regions: the southern part lies in the Doupov Mountains, the central part lies in the western tip of the Most Basin, and the northern part lies in the Ore Mountains.

History
Between 1150 and 1250, a settlement and a monastery were established by Benedictines from Postoloprty. It is not known, whether the settlement or the monastery is older. The settlement was named Klášterec (meaning "little monastery"), derived from klášter ("monastery"). The first written mention of Klášterec is from 1352.

The Hussite Wars did not affect the town too much. In the half of the 15th century, Klášterec is already referred to as a market town. At the beginning of the 16th century, the town wall was completed. During the 16th century, houses were built behind this wall, which created the so-called "lower town".

In 1794, the oldest porcelain factory and the second oldest factory in Bohemia overall was founded. In the years to come the town grew in importance as one of the earliest European regions of porcelain production and became famous for its porcelain. The original owners of the Klášterec nad Ohří porcelain factory, the Princes of Thun und Hohenstein, were in 1945 expelled from Czechoslovakia along with the remaining ethnic German population.

Over the years, a number of settlements were attached to Klášterec nad Ohří, most of them only in the second half of the 20th century, some of then already as extinct villages. Šumná and Útočiště have been administered by Klášterec since its inception, and Lestkov has belonged to Klášterec since the beginning of the 17th century. In 1950, Miřetice was joined, in 1961, Klášterecká Jeseň (including the area of extinct villages of Kunov and Vysoké), Ciboušov, Rašovice and Suchý Důl were joined, and finally in 1988 Hradiště (including the area of extinct villages of Pavlov and Potočná), Vernéřov and Mikulovice were joined.

Demographics

Economy
There is still porcelain production under the trade name Thun 1794 a.s. It is the largest Czech porcelain manufacturer. The factory in Klášterec has a capacity of approximately 1,000 tonnes per year.

Sights

The historic centre is made up of Dr. Eduarda Beneše Square with its surroundings, including the castle complex. The main building on the square is the town hall. It was built in the second half of the 19th century, after the original town hall burned down several times.

Klášterec nad Ohří Castle is the main landmark of the town. It was created by the reconstruction of the manor house in 1590–1618 and rebuilt to the present Neo-Gothic style in 1856–1860. It is open to the public and it includes a porcelain museum, and large and dendrologically significant English-style park with the salla terrena (a one-storey summer house) and a set of chapels of the Seven Pains of the Virgin Mary from the 90s of the 17th century.

The Church of the Holy Trinity was built in 1665–1670 by plans of Carlo Lurago. It containts tomb of the Thun family.

In Lestkov, there are ruins of Egerberk castle above the village.

Notable people
Michael Brokoff (1686–1721), sculptor

Twin towns – sister cities

Klášterec nad Ohří is twinned with:
 Großrückerswalde, Germany

See also
Porcelain manufacturing companies in Europe

References

External links

Cities and towns in the Czech Republic
Populated places in Chomutov District